Nesdi Jones aka Nêst Aneirin (born 11 December 1992) is a Welsh singer-songwriter.

Born and brought up in Criccieth, North Wales, who sings and raps in four languages: Hindi, Punjabi, English and Welsh. Her debut Punjabi hit song ‘London’ was a successful collaboration with Money Aujla and Yo Yo Honey Singh. The catchy track topped the Asian charts to Number 1. She won best newcomer award in the UK Bhangra Music Awards. She is also known as Desi Gori by her Fans.

A Welsh TV channel "S4C" aired a special documentary about her journey over the last three years in which time she has become a huge star in India.

She worked in a local Criccieth restaurant and is engaged.

References

1992 births
Welsh singer-songwriters
Living people
21st-century Welsh women singers
Bhangra (music) musicians